Walter Richter (May 13, 1905 – July 26, 1985) was a German actor.  From 1970 until 1982 he starred in the Norddeutscher Rundfunk version of the popular television crime series Tatort.

Selected filmography
 The Citadel of Warsaw (1937) as  Oberleutnant Strelkoff
 Morituri (1948), as Dr. Leon Bronek
 The Allure of Danger (1950), as Jens
 As Long as You're Near Me (1953), as Willi
 Dunja (1955), as Stationmaster
  (1956), as Wilhelm Henschel
 When the Heath Is in Bloom (1960), as Jochen Petersen
  (1967, TV miniseries), as Brassac
  (1968, TV miniseries), as Manfred Krupka's Father
  (1970), as Vermouth-Ede
 Tatort (1970–1982, TV series), as Kriminalhauptkommissar Paul Trimmel
  (1975), as Arthur

External links

1905 births
1985 deaths
Male actors from Berlin
German male television actors
German male film actors
20th-century German male actors